Bennetta Slaughter is the owner of 24Seven Media group, an advertising and marketing company based in Memphis TN.

Career 

Slaughter was the CEO and a partner of Agent Media Corporation. In 2004, the owners of AMC sold the company to Post Capital Partners LLC, a New York-based private investment firm, and Roscoe C. Smith III, a publishing industry veteran.

Controversy 

In 1995,  Slaughter, an influential Scientologist, was caught up in controversy surrounding the death of an employee and friend, Lisa McPherson, in Clearwater, Fla.

McPherson was a long-time Scientologist who moved in 1994 from Dallas to Clearwater with her employer, AMC Publishing. The company is operated and staffed largely by Scientologists who want to be close to the Church of Scientology's spiritual headquarters in downtown. Bennetta Slaughter was her supervisor and friend for 12 years.  In 1995 Lisa McPherson died of a pulmonary embolism, weeks after leaving the hospital against medical advice with a group of Scientologists, while under the care of the Flag Service Organization (FSO), a branch of the Church of Scientology. Following her death the Church of Scientology was indicted on two felony charges "abuse and/or neglect of a disabled adult and practicing medicine without a license", putting under trial the nature of Scientology beliefs and practices.  According to Slaughter's own court testimony, McPherson officially listed Slaughter as "next of kin" on her medical record, and Slaughter was the only person Lisa identified to be contacted in case of an emergency.

Of Lisa's death, Slaughter was quoted as saying: "I think she got sick and she died. There's nothing else there."  She later took an active role in defending Scientology from the wrongful death lawsuit for the death of Lisa McPherson, and she explained her role as such: "I will, in fact, counter any hate that will come from them and I will handle that"  Slaughter also tried to counter the efforts of prominent Scientology critic Bob Minton to set up a foundation to help Scientology victims. After Minton announced plans to name his group after Lisa McPherson, Slaughter quickly registered and became the head of the Lisa McPherson Foundation (with 300 members according to Slaughter), the Lisa Foundation, the Friends of Lisa McPherson Foundation, and the Lisa McPherson Educational Foundation. All these organisations were dissolved in September 2003 for failing to file the annual report. Her actions were against the wishes of Lisa's family, who support Minton's organization, the Lisa McPherson trust.   In December 1997, Bennetta Slaughter and AMC Publishing were added to the wrongful death lawsuit. The charges were dropped on June 13, 2000, when the state's medical examiner changed the cause of death from "undetermined" to an "accident". A civil suit brought by McPherson's family against the Church was settled on May 28, 2004.

References

External links
Insurance Media Services Founder Benetta Slaughter (ca. November 2010)
 Bennetta Slaughter and John Carmichael visit Scientology critic Jeff Lee 
Article on Slaughter's role in the aftermath of Reed Slatkin's bankruptcy
Slaughter and Applied Scholastics not welcome in St. Louis
Bennetta Slaughter's Scientology Profile (ca. 2004)
Bennetta Slaughter Business Profile (ca. 2009)

American Scientologists
Year of birth missing (living people)
Living people